Silvis is a city in Rock Island County, Illinois, United States. It is part of a larger metropolitan area known as the Quad Cities. The Quad Cities Metropolitan Area is situated across four counties in Illinois and Iowa. It is located four miles from the intersection of Interstate 80 and Interstate 88, 165 miles west of Chicago, Illinois, and 165 miles east of Des Moines. It sits next to East Moline and Moline.

The area has a rate media market with 308,910 TV households in a designated market area, or 2.7% of United States. Silvis also is near two major medical centers, including a critical access center. Silvis also has two community college districts, a liberal arts college, a public university auxiliary campus, two private universities, and two extension services in the area.

Demographics

As of 2019, the population of Silvis is 7,475 with 2,984 households, and 1,939 families residing in the city. The racial makeup of the city was 86.09% White, 3.45% African American, 0.47% Native American, 0.81% Asian, 6.51% from other races, and 2.67% from two or more races. Hispanic or Latino ethnicities made up 14.36% of the population.

There were 2,984 households, out of which 31.4% had children under the age of 18, 47.2% were married couples, 13.8% had a female householder with no husband present, and 35.0% were non-families. 30.9% of all households were made up of individuals, and 15.8% had someone living alone who was 65 years of age or older. The average household size was 2.41, and the average family size was 3.01.

In the city, the population was 25.6% under the age of 18, 8.9% aged 18 to 24, 26.9% aged 25 to 44, 22.3% aged 45 to 64, and 16.3% who were 65 years of age or older. The median age was 38 years. For every 100 females, there were 91.4 males. For every 100 females aged 18 and over, there were 86.5 males.

The median income for a household in the city was $35,047, and the median income for a family was $41,390. Males had a median income of $32,451, versus $22,050 for females. The per capita income for the city was $16,764. About 8.4% of families and 9.5% of the population were below the poverty line, including 14.9% of those under age 18 and 6.5% of those age 65 or over.

History
The City of Silvis (initially named Pleasant Valley) was incorporated in 1906. The city took its name from Richard Shippen Silvis, one of the original settlers whose family operated the Silvis Mining Company. Some older sources give the alternate spelling of "Sylvis" although this spelling is not regularly used today.

Rock Island Line Silvis Workshops 
In 1902, the Rock Island Line decided to build its largest railroad locomotive repair workshop in Silvis, on a 900-acre site between the railroad's main line and the Chicago, Burlington and Quincy Railroad’s Rock Island branch. Construction began on May 1, 1903; the facilities eventually included a general stores department, repair shop, 45-stall roundhouse, and two large freight yards east and west.

The need for cheap labor brought about a number of immigrants from Mexico, who either worked in the stores, the workshops or as part of the track laboring team. The railway developed housing to house all of its workers and families, which it rented to the workers at favorable rates which were possible under an agreement with the town that meant the occupants paid no property taxes. The Mexican section became known as La Yadra, which had its own Mexican-run general stores, and had a Mexican-themed band. When the band waned, the railway donated boxcars that had once housed its instruments were refurbished to create the Lady of Guadalupe church, dedicated on Easter Sunday in 1927. In 1929 the no property tax agreement came to an end, and the city authorities evicted the railway workers, many of whom moved their houses to the area that became second, third and fourth streets.

After The Rock was liquidated in 1980, the locomotive workshops, yard & facilities were used for storage of locomotives & railcars that would soon be sold off to other railroads.  The facility would later be sold to National Railway Equipment, the workshops remained a maintenance and refurbishment hub for the wider North American railroad industry. NRE sold the facility to Railroading Heritage of Midwest America in late 2021, who have plans to refurbish the facility to maintain steam, heritage diesel and associated rolling stock, and develop a museum on the site.

Golf course 
The city is home to TPC Deere Run, a public golf course designed by former PGA Tour professional D.A. Weibring along the area's famous Rock River. Golf Digest once ranked it No. 42 among U.S. public golf courses, while Golfweek Magazine has called it among the state's top five courses. Since 2000, TPC Deere Run has hosted the PGA Tour's annual John Deere Classic, previously known as the Quad Cities Open. The John Deere Classic is held in July the week before the British Open.

Hero Street USA 

The name of the city's Second Street—a muddy two-block thoroughfare that was once home to Mexican immigrants who worked for the Rock Island Railroad—was changed in 1967 to Hero Street to honor people who lived on the two-block street and served in the U.S. military. A total of 84 men served in World War II, Korea, and in Vietnam. Eight died during World War II: Joseph Gomez, Peter Macias, Johnny Muños, Tony Pompa, Frank Sandoval, Joseph "Joe" Sandoval, William "Willie" Sandoval, and Claro Solis.

Eduvigis and Angelina Sandoval immigrated to the U.S. from Romita, Mexico. Their son, Frank, was a combat engineer assigned to help build the Ledo Road in Burma. He was killed when his unit was sent to the front to fight for control of a key airbase. His older brother, Joe, assigned to the 41st Armored Infantry Division in Europe, was killed in April 1945, just days before the war ended.

Joseph and Carmen Sandoval also immigrated to the United States from Mexico. When the war broke out, they consented to their son Willie's request to enlist in the army. Trained as a paratrooper and assigned to the 82nd Airborne Division, he fought in Italy and Germany, and was killed on October 6, 1944, during a combat mission related to Operation Market-Garden, the largest airborne operation of all time.

Silvis Mayor, William Tatmen renamed the street Hero Street USA in May 1967. On 30 October 1971 a city park was built and dedicated as Hero Street Park to honor the eight deceased Hispanic (Latin American) servicemen from Hero Street USA. The park contains a pictorial monument, a grotto, a playground, and a pavilion. The monument contains pictures and biographies of the eight-deceased veteran from Hero Street, the grotto displays the names of all war dead from Silvis.

In 2015, Fourth Wall Films released a documentary, "Letters Home to Hero Street", by Emmy-nominated filmmakers Kelly and Tammy Rundle.

Schools
Silvis public schools belong to three districts, Carbon Cliff-Barstow School District 36, East Moline School District 37, and Silvis School District 34. There are three Silvis preschool schools., three elementary schools, one junior high school and one high school belonging to the Silvis school districts.

Preschools
 George O. Barr Elementary
 Learning Tree Child Care Center
 It's a Child's World

Elementary schools
 George O. Barr Elementary
 Eagle Ridge
 Bowlesburg Elementary

Middle/Junior High schools
 North East Junior High School

High schools
 United Township High School

References

External links
Official Website
 https://web.archive.org/web/20070820005754/http://www.neta.com/~1stbooks/hero.htm
 https://web.archive.org/web/20050827020515/http://www.herostreetusa.org/HeroStMain.htm
 http://www.city-data.com/county/Rock_Island_County-IL.html
 http://developsilvis.com/index.html
 http://www.johndeereclassic.com
 http://herostreetusa.org
 https://www.youtube.com/watch?v=cX5dbkD69Wc
 https://www.indiegogo.com/projects/hero-street-a-documentary-film

Cities in Rock Island County, Illinois
Cities in Illinois
Cities in the Quad Cities
Populated places established in 1906
1906 establishments in Illinois